Charles Ronald McKay Granger,  (August 12, 1912 – April 22, 1995) was a Canadian and Newfoundland politician.

Born in Catalina, Newfoundland, one of two children of David Charles and Emilie Sarah (Bursey) Granger, Granger was educated at St. Peter's Anglican High School.

Granger was elected as a Liberal Member of Parliament (MP) for the riding of Grand Falls—White Bay—Labrador in the 1958 election. He was re-elected in 1962, 1963, and 1965.

In August 1966, he resigned from the House of Commons of Canada and became a Member of the House of Assembly (MHA) for the District of Gander in the Newfoundland and Labrador House of Assembly. He was appointed Minister of Labrador Affairs.

Granger resigned from the House of Assembly on September 25, 1967, and returned to the House of Commons after winning a 1967 federal by-election in the riding of Bonavista—Twillingate following the retirement of Cabinet minister Jack Pickersgill. However,  he was defeated by John Howard Lundrigan in the 1968 election.

Following his defeat, Granger was a vice-president of Shaheen Natural Resources Company from 1968 to 1975 .

In 1994, he was made an Officer of the Order of Canada.

On June 19, 1950, he married Elizabeth Jane French and they had four children.

External links
Order of Canada Citation
 
 Charles Ronald McKay Granger fonds, Library and Archives Canada

1912 births
1995 deaths
Liberal Party of Newfoundland and Labrador MHAs
Liberal Party of Canada MPs
Officers of the Order of Canada
Members of the House of Commons of Canada from Newfoundland and Labrador
Members of the King's Privy Council for Canada
People from Trinity Bay North